Franco Faustino Arizala Hurtado (born June 4, 1986) is a Colombian football striker who plays for Alebrijes de Oaxaca. He also holds Mexican citizenship.

Honours
León
Liga MX (2): Apertura 2013, Clausura 2014

References

External links

Living people
Colombian footballers
Colombian expatriate footballers
Cortuluá footballers
Boyacá Chicó F.C. footballers
Deportes Tolima footballers
C.F. Pachuca players
Chiapas F.C. footballers
Club León footballers
Atlas F.C. footballers
Club Puebla players
Atlético Bucaramanga footballers
Al-Arabi SC (Qatar) players
Cafetaleros de Chiapas footballers
Alebrijes de Oaxaca players
Qatar Stars League players
Categoría Primera A players
Categoría Primera B players
Liga MX players
Ascenso MX players
Expatriate footballers in Mexico
Naturalized citizens of Mexico
Sportspeople from Nariño Department
Association football inside forwards
Colombian expatriate sportspeople in Qatar
Expatriate footballers in Qatar
1986 births